The reticulated sparganothis (Sparganothis reticulatana) is a moth of the family Tortricidae. It is found in most of eastern North America.

The wingspan is 15–17 mm. Adults are on wing from June to August.

The larvae feed on alder, apple, ash, aster, beech, blueberry, cherry, maple, oak and pear.

References

External links
Bug Guide
Images

Sparganothis
Moths of North America
Moths described in 1860
Taxa named by James Brackenridge Clemens